SOCOM U.S. Navy SEALs: Fireteam Bravo is a tactical shooter video game developed by Zipper Interactive and published by Sony Computer Entertainment for PlayStation Portable. It is the first SOCOM U.S. Navy SEALs game in the Fireteam Bravo series. It has both online play (infrastructure mode) and PSP to PSP play (ad hoc). It is similar to the main series games.

The online servers for this game, along with other PlayStation 2 and PlayStation Portable SOCOM titles, were shut down on August 31, 2012.

Gameplay
The most notable difference between Fireteam Bravo and its main series counterparts is the aiming system. The main series' controllers have two analog sticks, while the Fireteam Bravo series has only one. To aim, the player must "lock on" with the R button onto a target and then fire. Within the game there are sniper rifles, assault rifles, machine guns, explosive attachments, ballistic weaponry, and grenades.

Multiplayer
The game supports up to 16 players at a time, voice chat, and a variety of modes. Fireteam Bravo lacks a ladder system of its own. It includes number of variety of gameplay modes such as Free For All and Captive.

Reception

SOCOM U.S. Navy SEALs: Fireteam Bravo received "generally positive" reviews, according to review aggregator Metacritic.

References

External links
 

2005 video games
Multiplayer and single-player video games
PlayStation Portable games
PlayStation Portable-only games
SOCOM U.S. Navy SEALs
Video games about the United States Navy SEALs
Video games developed in the United States
Video games scored by James Dooley (composer)
Video games set in Asia
Video games set in Chile
Video games set in Morocco
Video games set in Poland
Zipper Interactive games